Santa Dorotea is an ancient Roman Catholic church in the Diocese of Rome first attested to in a Papal bull of Pope Callistus II in 1123, being referred to under its first dedication of San Silvestro alla Porta Settimiana.

History
In 1445 it was recorded under the double dedication of SS Silvestro e Dorotea, the latter, Dorothea of Caesarea, being an obscure martyr of Caesarea in Cappadocia (modern Kayseri, Turkey) who might have been killed in the early 4th century if she existed at all. In 1475 the church was rebuilt and given full parochial status, and the relics of St Dorothy were enshrined here by Giuliano De Datis, the parish priest, in 1500.

In 1727 the parish was suppressed, and in 1738 the church was granted to the Friars Minor Conventual. They demolished it again, and rebuilt it as the chapel of their new convent on the site. The rebuilding was entrusted to Giovanni Battista Nolli by Giovanni Carlo Vipera, Minister-General of the Conventuals. The parish was re-erected in 1824, and the church restored and re-consecrated in 1879.

On 12 June 2014 it was established as a titular church by Pope Francis with Javier Cardinal Lozano Barragán, president emeritus of the Pontifical Council for Pastoral Assistance to Health Care Workers, as its first Cardinal-Priest having served 10 years as a cardinal-deacon.

List of Cardinal-Priests
 Javier Cardinal Lozano Barragán (12 June 2014 – 20 April 2022)
 Jorge Enrique Jiménez Carvajal (27 August 2022 – present)

References

15th-century Roman Catholic church buildings in Italy
Titular churches
Baroque architecture in Rome
Roman Catholic churches completed in 1824
Churches of Rome (rione Trastevere)